J. Harold Stacey (February 24, 1898 – May 5, 1963) was a Vermont businessman and politician who served as Speaker of the Vermont House of Representatives.

Biography
James Harold Stacey was born in Tolland, Connecticut on February 24, 1898. He was raised in Royalton, Vermont and attended Dartmouth College and the Massachusetts Institute of Technology.

Stacey joined the United States Navy for World War I, received a commission as an Ensign, and was trained as a pilot.

In 1919 Stacey settled in Windsor, Vermont, where he operated an ice, building materials and home heating business.

A Republican, Stacey was elected to the Vermont House of Representatives in 1942 and served four terms, 1943 to 1951.  From 1949 to 1951 Stacey was Speaker of the House.

In 1950 Stacey lost the Republican primary for Governor to Lee E. Emerson, who went on to win the general election.

Stacey later served on the state Fish and Game Commission.  In 1954 he was elected to the Vermont Senate and served one term, 1955 to 1957. In June 1956 Stacey was appointed to head the Vermont Development Commission.

J. Harold Stacey died on May 5, 1963 in the hospital in Hanover, New Hampshire following a long illness. He was buried at Ascutney Cemetery in Windsor.

References

External links

1898 births
1963 deaths
People from Tolland, Connecticut
People from Windsor, Vermont
United States Navy personnel of World War I
Republican Party members of the Vermont House of Representatives
Speakers of the Vermont House of Representatives
Republican Party Vermont state senators
Burials in Vermont
20th-century American politicians